This is a list of years in Andorra. For only articles about years in San Marino that have been written, see :Category:Years in Andorra.

13th – 19th century 
1200s ·
1300s ·
1400s ·
1500s ·
1600s ·
1700s ·
1800s

20th century 
Decades: 1900s ·
1910s ·
1920s ·
1930s ·
1940s ·
1950s ·
1960s ·
1970s ·
1980s ·
1990s

21st century

See also 

 
Andorra-related lists
Andorra
years